Dmitri Sergeyevich Chvanov (born 8 January 1994) is a Russian football player. He plays as a goalkeeper for FC Orenburg-2.

Club career
He made his debut in the Russian Football National League for FC Gazovik Orenburg on 11 October 2014 in a game against FC SKA-Energiya Khabarovsk.

References

External links
Profile by Russian Football National League

1994 births
Sportspeople from Krasnoyarsk
Living people
Russian footballers
Association football goalkeepers
FC Orenburg players
FC Nosta Novotroitsk players